Brian Hurley (born 2 April 1992) is an Irish Gaelic footballer who plays as a full forward for the Cork senior team.

Born in County Cork, Hurley first played competitive Gaelic football during his schooling days.  He arrived on the inter-county scene at the age of seventeen when he first linked up with the Cork minor team, before later joining the under-21 side. He made his senior debut during the 2013 championship. Since then Hurley has become a regular member of the starting fifteen.

Hurley has also lined out with the Munster inter-provincial team. At club level he is a two-time championship medallist with Castlehaven.

Career statistics

Club

Inter-county

Honours
Castlehaven
Cork Senior Football Championship (2): 2012, 2013

Cork
Munster Under-21 Football Championship (3): 2011 (sub), 2012, 2013
Munster Minor Football Championship (1): 2010
All-Ireland Vocational Schools Senior Championship (1): 2010
Munster Mc Grath Cups (2) : 2014 , 2016

References

1992 births
Living people
Castlehaven Gaelic footballers
Cork inter-county Gaelic footballers
Munster inter-provincial Gaelic footballers